Tim Hoeijmans (born 16 February 1974) is a Dutch swimmer. He competed in the men's 4 × 200 metre freestyle relay event at the 1996 Summer Olympics.

References

External links
 

1974 births
Living people
Olympic swimmers of the Netherlands
Swimmers at the 1996 Summer Olympics
Sportspeople from Heerlen
Dutch male freestyle swimmers
20th-century Dutch people